Eckington is a small village near to the southern border of the English county of Worcestershire, according to the 2001 census it had a population of 1,202.

The village is surrounded by the River Avon and often experiences flooding on its entry roads. It is situated at the north-west side of Bredon Hill, an outcrop of the Cotswolds.

Eckington is renowned for Eckington Bridge, which is the subject of a poem by Arthur Quiller-Couch, its village cross and its Norman-period church. It has a thriving first school, the Eckington Church of England First School, a scout hut with surrounding recreation grounds, home to village's football and cricket teams, and a well used village hall.

Eckington has a village shop and 2 hairdressers. It currently has two pubs The Bell and The Anchor, both offering food and guest accommodation; a third pub, The Crown, closed in the early 1990s.

Eckington railway station was located on the Bristol to Birmingham Line main railway line. It closed in January 1965.

One of the Pilgrim Fathers, George Soule, is believed to have come from the village.

References

External links

Eckington website
Eckington Bridge, 1929, picture by Walter J. Phillips
Upon Eckington Bridge, River Avon by Sir Arthur Quiller-Couch
Eckington F.C website

Villages in Worcestershire